Uta Kargel (born May 28, 1981 in Halle (Saale)) is a German Playboy model, actress, and voice actress

Career and personal life

Uta Kargel was born in Halle (Saale) in the former GDR and later moved to East Berlin with her family. She started modelling at the age of 18. After school she first finished her job training as a bookseller. At the same time she started acting in the stage group Grüner Hund that she had cofounded in 2002.

On television Kargel had her breakthrough with the role as Lena Bachmann in the German soap opera Gute Zeiten, schlechte Zeiten, where she appeared in 487 episodes until she left in 2006. Kargel started studying culturology., which she paused for two years when she got a leading role in the soap opera Storm of Love. After 2011 Kargel worked in the patient's library of the Charité and as a school aide at a primary school, while she finished her studies with a master's degree. With a few of her friends the founded BiK Pictures, an independent film company, which produced its first feature film Kartenhaus with Kargel in one of the leading roles in 2017 with the help of crowdfunding. After returning to Storm of Love for just seven episodes in 2017, her role became continuous, when she returned again in March 2018. In episode 3381 (May 2020) Kargel left Storm of Love again after a total of 808 episodes. As a voice actress, Kargel dubs roles voiced by Bai Ling.

In 2017 Kargel survived a heavy car crash on a road trip from Denver to Los Angeles without any injuries.

In August 2019 Kargel and the Italian photographer Nicoló Lanfranchi posted a series of photos on Instagram, which revealed, that they were in a relationship. Kargel still lives and works in Germany, while Lanfranchi lives in Italy. Kargel has one sister.

Kargel became known to a broader public, when she posed for the November 2019 issue of the German edition of Playboy.

Film

Television

Stage

References

External links
 
  on Instagram
  on Facebook

1981 births
Living people
Actresses from Berlin
German film actresses
German television actresses
People from Halle (Saale)
People from Saxony-Anhalt
21st-century German actresses